The 2006–07 Eredivisie season was the 48th season of the Eredivisie in basketball, the highest professional basketball league in the Netherlands. EiffelTowers Den Bosch won their 14th national title.

Regular season

Playoffs

Dutch Basketball League seasons
1
Netherlands